The Battle of Rocoux took place on 11 October 1746 during the War of the Austrian Succession, at Rocourt (or Rocoux), near Liège in the Prince-Bishopric of Liège, now modern Belgium. It was fought between a French army under Marshal Saxe and a combined British, Dutch, German and Austrian force led by Charles of Lorraine, John Ligonier and Prince Waldeck. 

Despite a series of victories in Flanders, by 1746 France was struggling to finance the war, and opened bilateral peace negotiations with Britain at the Congress of Breda in August. While Rocoux confirmed French control of the Austrian Netherlands, Saxe failed to achieve a decisive victory, and the two armies went into winter quarters to prepare for a new campaign in 1747.

Background
When the War of the Austrian Succession began in 1740, Britain was still fighting the War of Jenkins' Ear with Spain; from 1739 to 1742, the main area of operations was in the Caribbean. British and Dutch troops initially fought as part of the army of Hanover; it was not until March 1744 that France formally declared war on Britain, while the Dutch Republic officially remained neutral until 1747. 

French victory at Fontenoy in April 1745 was followed by the capture of the key ports of Ostend, Ghent and Nieuwpoort, while the 1745 Jacobite Rising forced Britain to transfer troops to Scotland. In the first months of 1746, the French took Louvain, Brussels and Antwerp; bolstered by these successes, Foreign Minister d'Argenson sent peace proposals to Britain.

Despite their victories in Flanders, the French had failed to achieve a decisive result, while the British still hoped to retrieve their position. With the defeat of the Rising in April, Earl Ligonier returned from Scotland to assume command of the Hanoverian and British troops. By now, only British subsidies kept their allies in the war; Austria's top priority was to regain Silesia from Prussia and they acquired the Austrian Netherlands in 1713, only because neither the British or Dutch would allow the other to control it. The Dutch also wanted peace, since the fighting badly affected trade and these factors played an important role in the 1746 campaign.

Battle

Often referred to as Flanders, the Austrian Netherlands was a compact area 160 kilometres wide, the highest point only 100 metres above sea level, and dominated by canals and rivers. Until the 19th century, commercial and military goods were largely transported by water and wars in this theatre generally fought for control of rivers such as the Lys, Sambre and Meuse. Between February to July 1746, the French took Brussels, Antwerp, Leuven and Mons, then moved onto towns along the Meuse, beginning with Charleroi (see Map). 

In mid-July, the Pragmatic Army prepared to defend Namur; leaving the Prince de Conti to finish with Charleroi, Saxe cut their supply lines, forcing them to retreat. By late September, Namur had fallen and the Allies moved to protect Liège, the next town on the Meuse. Most estimates of the numbers suggest between 70,000  to 75,000 Allied troops  faced a French force of 110,000 to 120,000.  
 
Anchored on the left by the Liège suburbs, the Allied line ran through Rocoux to the River Jeker; the Dutch under Waldeck held the left, the British and Germans  in the centre and the Austrians, who formed the largest part of the army, on the right. The Allied position was divided by several rivers and deep ravines, making the movement of troops across it almost impossible; in the ensuing battle, this meant the Austrians played little part in the heavy fighting which took place on the Allied left and centre.   

French cavalry made contact with the Austrian outposts around 18:00 on 10 October, then halted for the night, and camped outside Liège. Knowing they were substantially outnumbered, Charles of Lorraine ordered the baggage train across the Meuse to allow an orderly retreat, and Ligonier's troops fortified the villages of Rocoux, Varoux and Liers. Saxe decided to attack the Allied left and centre, leaving a small screening force to pin down the Austrians on the right.  

A night of heavy rain was followed by thick mist and so the French did not begin the battle until the weather cleared around 10:00 am, when their artillery opened fire on the British and Dutch positions. At the same time, two columns led by Clermont-Tonnerre and Lowendahl prepared a frontal attack. After the Liège authorities opened the town gates, a third column under de Contades moved through the town and outflanked Waldeck, who re-aligned his troops to face this threat. Completing these movements delayed the main French assault until 15:00 and the Dutch put up strong resistance, particularly around the village of Ance, which they finally lost after two hours of heavy fighting.  Counter-attacks by the Dutch cavalry eventually allowed their infantry to pull back in good order.
    

A second French attack was made against the British-German troops in the centre, who were driven out of their fortified positions in Rocoux and Vercoux, before regrouping further back. Although Von Zastrow retained Liers, the Dutch, British and German infantry withdrew towards the Meuse, covered by the Austrians, who had not been directly engaged. George II later criticised Charles of Lorraine for allegedly failing to support the British and Dutch, but Ligonier said he had acted in accordance with the plan agreed by the Allied leadership the night before. 

Saxe decided it was too late in the day to continue the attack, allowing his opponents to retreat with little interference. The British, Germans and Dutch crossed the Meuse on three Pontoon bridges, while the Austrians withdrew over the Jeker, before heading for Maastricht. Estimates of casualties vary, French losses being around 3,000 to 4,000 killed or wounded, those of the Allies between 8,000 to 10,000, including 3,000 prisoners.

Aftermath
Although Rocoux led to the capture of Liège, and opened the way for an attack on the Dutch Republic, a well-organised retreat conducted by the Allies prevented Saxe from achieving a decisive victory. Led by the Marquis de Puisieux, France began bilateral negotiations with Britain at Breda in August 1746. These proceeded slowly, since the British envoy Lord Sandwich was under instructions to delay, hoping their position in Flanders would improve. In the January 1747 Hague Convention, Britain agreed to fund Austrian and Sardinian forces in Italy, and an Allied army of 140,000 in Flanders, increasing to 192,000 in 1748. 

However, by late 1746, Austrian forces had expelled Spanish Bourbon troops from Northern Italy and neither France nor Spain could afford to continue funding their campaign. With the removal of this threat, Maria Theresa of Austria wanted peace to restructure her administration and allegedly used her British subsidies to pay for infrastructure projects in Vienna. Hoping to retrieve the position in Flanders, the Duke of Newcastle persuaded his allies to make another attempt, which ended with defeat at Lauffeld in July 1747.

Notes

References

Sources

 
 
 
 
 
 
 
 
 
 
 
 
 
 
 
 

Rocoux
Rocoux
Rocoux
Rocoux
Rocoux
Rocoux
Rocoux
1746 in the Holy Roman Empire
1746 in the Habsburg  monarchy
1746 in France
1746 in Great Britain
History of Liège